{{DISPLAYTITLE:Tau1 Hydrae}}

Tau1 Hydrae is a triple star system in the equatorial constellation of Hydra. The system has a combined apparent visual magnitude of +4.59, which is bright enough to be visible to the naked eye at night.

The inner pair of stars form a single-lined spectroscopic binary with an orbital period of about 2,807 days and an eccentricity of 0.33. The visible member of the pair, component A, is a visual magnitude 4.60 F-type main sequence star with a stellar classification of F6 V. During the 1990s, it was thought to be a Gamma Doradus variable, but this was later discounted as it shows no short-term photometric variability. The star does show some long-term variability, possibly as a result of a magnetic activity cycle similar to the solar cycle.

The tertiary member, component B, is a visual magnitude 7.15 K-type star with a class of K0. It lies at a separation of 1,120 AU from the primary. As of 2012, it was positioned at an angular separation of 67.5 arc seconds along a position angle of 4°.

References

F-type main-sequence stars
Triple star systems
Hydrae, Tau
Hydra (constellation)
0348
Hydrae, 31
081997
046509
3787
Durchmusterung objects
Uḳdah I